Droitwich Spa Football Club is a football club representing the town of Droitwich Spa, Worcestershire, England. For the 2017/18 season they ground shared with Stourport Swifts F.C. at Stourport Swifts' Walshes Meadow. The club returned to Droitwich during the 2022/23 season with the completion of redevelopment work at their King George V ground. The ground was officially opened on 10th November 2022 by former England national football team player and manager, Kevin Keegan </ref>. The team are known as 'The Saltmen'.

History
The club was established in 1985 as a Sunday league club, only moving into Saturday football in 2000, when they joined the Midland Combination. In 2006–07 the club finished third in Division Two, earning promotion to Division One. In 2014 the league merged with the Midland Football Alliance to form the Midland League, with the club becoming members of Division Two.

In 2016–17 Droitwich ended the season as Division Two champions and were set to be promoted to Division One. However, they received a controversial points deduction after the season had ended, which led to them dropping to third place in the table. Although they remained in Division Two, the club entered the FA Vase in the 2017–18 season.

The club faced Worcester City F.C. in the first round of the Worcestershire Senior Cup during the 2022–2023 season. This is the first time the two sides have played against each other in formal competition. The match ended in a 3–0 win for Droitwich Spa FC in front of 973 spectators at the King George V Ground.

References

External links
Official website

Football clubs in England
Football clubs in Worcestershire
Association football clubs established in 1985
1985 establishments in England
Midland Football Combination
Midland Football League